John Beatty (born 1951) is a professor in the Department of Philosophy at the University of British Columbia in Vancouver, British Columbia. He received his PhD in 1979 in the History and Philosophy of Science at Indiana University, Bloomington, Indiana. His research focuses on the theoretical foundations, methodology, and socio-political dimensions of genetics and evolutionary biology.  He is well known in the philosophy of biology community.

External links
Beatty's personal website

Philosophers of science
Philosophy academics
Academic staff of the University of British Columbia
Living people
1951 births
Philosophers of biology
Canadian philosophers